Theatrical productions in Honduras are a relatively new phenomenon, with no established theatrical tradition.

History 
During the late 18th century, a form of theater known as pastorelas was introduced to Honduras. In 1750, the first theatrical performance in Honduras was Luis Vélez de Guevara's Devil Cojuelo in Comayagua. Despite subsequent productions, a theatrical tradition was not yet established. In 1915 the Manuel Bonilla National Theater was completed, where theater, opera, zarzuela and dance were performed.

Figures 
José Trinidad Reyes, founder of the National Autonomous University of Honduras, was a writer of pastorelas and his works were a foundation for theater in Honduras. Ramón Amaya Amador wrote several plays, including The Black Plague, The Chapetones and The Bad Woman, in 1959.

The works of Tito Ochoa, director of the Memories Theater, are still performed. Rafael Murillo Selva's Loubavagu (The Other Far Side) has been performed over a thousand times worldwide. Poet Daniel Laínez wrote Timoteo Amuses in 1946 and A Man of Influence in 1956.

Honduran actors and directors include Fredy David Ponce Rivas, Edy Barahona, Isidro Spain, Francisco Molina, Eleazar Úbeda, Johel Perla, Magda Alvarado, Elisa Logan, Hermes Kings, Dax Marcell, Hermes Zelaya, Edilberto González, Guillermo Fernández QDDG, Luis Joel Rivera, José Ramón Inestroza, Rigoberto Fernández, Mario Jaén, José Luis Recinos, Armando Valeriano, Damario Kings, José Francisco Saybe, Manuel Bonilla, Reiniery Andean, Delmer López, Sandra Herrera, Oscar Lemus, Oscar Zelaya, Oscar Barahona, David Martínez, Tito Estrada, Ybis Zelaya, Lourdes Ochoa, Elena of Larios, Maricela Nolasco, Susan Arteaga, Alba Luz Rogel, Cecilia Peacock, Lucy Ondina, Leonardo Mount of Goose (a mime), Robero Becerra, Roberto Carlo Rivera, Benjamín Safe, Mariela Zavala, Felipe Acosta, Alonzo Baires, Emma Martínez, Jorge Osorto and Javier Suazo.

Plays

Theaters 
 National Theatre Manuel Bonilla, Tegucigalpa (1915)
 Theatre José Francisco Saybe, San Pedro Sula
 House of Theatre Memories, Tegucigalpa
 Theatre Millenium, Comayagüela
 Theatre Nicolás Avellaneda, Comayagüela
 Theatre Renaissance
 Theatre Reform
 Theatre Father Trill in the UNAH
 Theatre of the Child Cultural Centre (CCI), San Pedro Sula
 Cultural Centre Sampedrano
 Theatre-Academy of Dance SOAM
 Theatre Fragua, El Progreso, Yoro
 Auditorium Zorzales, San Pedro Sula
 School of Musical Application, Alps Colony, San Pedro Sula
 Municipal Auditorium of the Redondel of the Artisans, Tegucigalpa
 Museum of Anthropology and History, San Pedro Sula 
 Centre of Arts Sampedrano, San Pedro Sula
 House of Culture of Santa Rosa de Copán
 House of Culture of Lima
 House of Culture of El Progreso
 House of Culture, Atlántida
 Cultural Centre of Spain, Tegucigalpa
 Great Commission Church, San Pedro Sula

Schools 
 National School of Dramatic Art (Tegucigalpa)
 Theatre the Fragua (Progress, Yoro)
 Centre of Qualification in Performing Arts (CC-ARTS), San Pedro Sula
 Department of Art, UNAH

Theater groups 
 Arteatro
 Theatrical Cafe, San Pedro Sula 
 Sampedrano Theatrical Circle 
 Ekela Itzá Theatre Company
 Foundation Theatre Walk Real
 Artistic Group Lenin Spanish (GALeC) of Atlántida Department
 Dramatic Group of Tegucigalpa
 Theatrical Group Mask
 Theatrical Group Bamboo
 Group of Theatre Images
 The Mocegada
 The Comics
 Theatre Bethel of Saint José of Ocotepeque Parish 
 Proyecto Teatral Futuro, San Pedro Sula
 National System of Culture
 Artistic Society for Children of Áuril, El Progreso
 Theatre Sampedrana, Sula
 Theatre Bay, Atlántida
 Theatre Bonsái, Port Cortés
 Theatre Culture Limeña
 Theatre Culture Limeña, La Lima, Cortés Department
 Theatre of Farándula 
 Theatre Lanigi Mua
 Theatre Fragua
 Theatre Mask
 Theatre Seeds, Trinidad, Santa Bárbara
 Theatre Laboratory of Honduras (TELAH)
 Latin Theatre
 Theatre Memories 
 Theatre Red Shadow
 Theatre Workshop Tegucigalpa (TTT)
 Ministerio Luz en lo Alto, San Pedro Sula

See also
 Culture of Honduras
 Manuel Bonilla National Theater
 Honduran literature

References

External links
 
 

Honduran culture
Theatre companies by country